Batticaloa may refer to:

 Batticaloa, a city in Eastern Province, Sri Lanka
 Batticaloa District, a district in Eastern Province, Sri Lanka
 Batticaloa Territory, the former district and the ancient territory at Eastern Province, Sri Lanka
 Batticaloa Electoral District, a multi-member electoral district of Sri Lanka
 Batticaloa Electoral District (1947-1989), a former single / two-member electoral district of Sri Lanka
 Batticaloa Lagoon, a large lagoon in Eastern Province, Sri Lanka
 Eastern University of Sri Lanka, Batticaloa
 History of Batticaloa